Yoshio Sakai (born May 2, 1910 – ?) was a Japanese field hockey player who competed in the 1932 Summer Olympics and in the 1936 Summer Olympics.

In 1932 he was a member of the Japanese field hockey team, which won the silver medal.

In the 1936 tournament he played all three matches as halfback for the Japanese field hockey team, when they were eliminated after the group stage.

He was born in Tokyo, Japan.

External links
 
profile

1910 births
Year of death missing
Sportspeople from Tokyo
Japanese male field hockey players
Olympic field hockey players of Japan
Field hockey players at the 1932 Summer Olympics
Field hockey players at the 1936 Summer Olympics
Olympic silver medalists for Japan
Olympic medalists in field hockey
Medalists at the 1932 Summer Olympics
20th-century Japanese people